Per Gustav Gösta Hjalmar Wallmark (June 11, 1928 in Luleå, Sweden – November 20, 2017 in Visby) is a Swedish artist.

Gösta Wallmark got his education from Otte Skölds målarskola in Stockholm, Ecole des Beaux Arts in Paris and at Royal Swedish Academy of Arts.

He created a wall relief at Garnisonen, Stockholm in 1972.

Together with Elis Eriksson he was responsible for the artistic decoration of Hallonbergen metro station in Stockholm which opened 31 August 1975.

5

References

1928 births
2017 deaths
People from Luleå
Swedish male artists